The Australian  is a broadsheet newspaper published in Australia.

The Australian may also refer to:

Other publications
 The Australian (1824 newspaper), newspaper published in Sydney between 1824 and 1848
 The Australian Financial Review, financial newspaper
 The Australian Horror and Fantasy Magazine, magazine published between 1984 and 1986
 The Australian Journal of Physiotherapy, medical journal, now Journal of Physiotherapy
 The Australian Way, inflight magazine, see Qantas#Inflight magazine
 The Australian (Perth 1907–08) newspaper

Other uses
 The Australian Advanced Air Traffic System (TAATS), the systems used by Airservices Australia for Air Traffic Control services
 The Australian Ballet Dance Company
 The Australian Golf Club
 The Australian Race, title of a book about Aboriginal Australians by Edward Micklethwaite Curr, published 1886
 The Australian/Vogel Literary Award Literary Award

See also
 Australian (disambiguation)